In the United Kingdom, an electoral registration officer (ERO) is a person who has the statutory duty to compile and maintain the electoral roll (which includes conducting the annual canvass). Any expenses incurred by an electoral registration officer in the performance of his/her functions are paid by the local authority which made the appointment, except in Northern Ireland, where the Chief Electoral Officer's expenses are covered by the Northern Ireland Office.

Appointment

England
In England, every district council is required to appoint an officer of the council to be the electoral registration officer. In the City of London, the Court of Common Council must appoint an officer as the electoral registration officer.

Northern Ireland
In Northern Ireland, the Electoral Office for Northern Ireland (led by the Chief Electoral Officer for Northern Ireland) is responsible for electoral registration.

Scotland
In Scotland, every local authority is required to appoint an officer of that council or an adjoining council, or jointly appoint an officer in conjunction with other local authorities as the electoral registration officer.

Wales
In Wales, every county borough council is required to appoint an officer of the council to be the electoral registration officer.

See also
Elections in the United Kingdom
Electoral Commission (United Kingdom)

References

Elections in the United Kingdom